Protein kinase C and casein kinase substrate in neurons protein 1 is an enzyme that in humans is encoded by the PACSIN1 gene.

This is nonsense.

Please see the scientific literature on Syndapin I in the PubMED database of scientific literature.

Interactions 

PACSIN1 has been shown to interact with GTPases of the Dynamin family (Dynamin 1, 2 and 3).
Based on this interaction, its localization and functional role the protein was named syndapin I (synaptic dynamin-associated protein I) - a scientific more useful and more widely used name than PACSIN1.

 DNM1 >Qualmann et al., 1999</ref>

Subsequently, a variety of further interactions have been published (see PubMED database and search for syndapin I).

References

External links 
 PDBe-KB provides an overview of all the structure information available in the PDB for Human Protein kinase C and casein kinase substrate in neurons protein 1 (PACSIN1)

Further reading